Lo Moon is the self-titled debut studio album from the Los Angeles-based band Lo Moon. It was released on February 23, 2018.

Reception

Lo Moon was met with "generally favorable" reviews from critics. At Metacritic, which assigns a weighted average rating out of 100 to reviews from mainstream publications, this release received an average score of 73, based on 7 reviews. Aggregator Album of the Year gave the release a 70 out of 100 based on a critical consensus of 9 reviews.

Track listing

Charts

References

2018 debut albums
Lo Moon albums
Columbia Records albums
Albums recorded at Kingsize Soundlabs
Albums recorded at Electro-Vox Recording Studios